Lydia Nnenna Obute is an Austrian model, best known for being the winner of the Cycle three of Austria's Next Topmodel.

Early life 
Obute was born in Lower Austria to Nigerian parents. Prior to her participation on AtNTM, she had some experience as a model walking for fashion designer Thang De Hoo.

Austria's Next Topmodel 
Being chosen among 4,500 hopefuls to be among the top 36, Obute qualified for the show among the top 4 from the Vienna auditions for the round of the final 14. She was involved in a controversy when fellow contestant Magalie Berghahn referred to her as "Neger Oide" (derogatory Austrian slang equivalent to "negro chick") in Episode 3 while having a phone conversation with her boyfriend that was taped and aired on television. Obute was confronted with that scene which was followed by a disqualification of Berghahn from the show. After being a favourite for the title, Obute won several castings during the show most namely a testimonial for Evian.
On 28 February 2011 she won the competition over Katharina Theuermann, the youngest contestant on the competition. She won the cover of Woman as well as a testimonial for a Hervis Sports campaign and two runway jobs in Milan and Paris.

References

External links 
Portfolio on Wiener Models
Profile on ModelManagement.com

Living people
Austrian female models
Next Top Model winners
1993 births
Austrian people of Nigerian descent
Austrian people of Igbo descent
People from Baden bei Wien